Jericho is an unincorporated community in Hampshire County in the U.S. state of West Virginia on the Virginia line. It is located on West Virginia Route 259 between High View and Lehew atop Timber Ridge.

References 

Unincorporated communities in Hampshire County, West Virginia
Unincorporated communities in West Virginia